Miandrivazo is a district of Menabe in Madagascar. It is crossed by the Manambolo River.

Communes
The district is further divided into 15 communes:

 Ambatolahy
 Ampanihy
 Ankavandra
 Ankondromena
 Ankotrofotsy
 Anosimena
 Bemahatazana
 Betsipolitra
 Dabolava
 Isalo
 Itondy
 Manambina
 Manandaza
 Miandrivazo
 Soaloka

References 

Districts of Menabe